The Brownie and the Princess: And Other Stories is a book of ten children's stories by the American author, Louisa May Alcott (1832–1888). The stories were published in various children's magazines during her lifetime. They were also previously published with two other stories in the collection A Round Dozen by Viking Press in 1963.

Synopsis
The Brownie and the Princess, the first of the stories, is about a young farmer girl, named Betty, who lives with her father. Since her mother has died, and, since she has no friends, she learns to talk to the birds and use all of her resources to survive. She milks her cow and roams in the fields all day long, talking to the squirrels, birds, bunnies and every living creature around her. One day, she overhears the birds talking about how the Princess is planning to visit her and make friends with Betty, whom they call the Brownie, because she is always dressed in a brown gown and hat. She is an animal lover, and the short story is all about how she teaches the Princess not to be spoiled, but to love the world around her and to help the animals. Once she has befriended the Princess, she teaches the Princess her real values and tells her that she must love the earth and care for it. The girl shortly after becomes very good friends with Brownie and visits her so the girl can teach her the meaning of being poor and not being a spoiled, haughty girl. This story is very meaningful and it teaches children to use their resources well and to respect the world and all the creatures inside of it.

The stories
 The Brownie and the Princess
 Tabby's Tablecloth
 A Hole in the Wall
 Lunch
 Baa! Baa! 
 The Silver Party
 How They Camped Out
 The Hare and the Tortoise
 Jerseys, or the Girl's Ghost
 The Cooking Class

References

External links

Stephen A. Adams

2004 short story collections
Children's short story collections
American short story collections
American children's books
Works by Louisa May Alcott
2004 children's books
HarperCollins books